Cartajima is a small village and municipality of Spain located in the province of Málaga, part of the autonomous community of Andalusia. It is located approximately 17 kilometres from Ronda and 105 km from the provincial capital. It has a total area of 21.47 km2 and, as of 2019, a population of 253.

References 

Municipalities in the Province of Málaga